Manoharpura is famous for Mashi dam. The village is situated near the Jodhpuriya temple of God Devnarayan in the Tonk district of Rajasthan, India.

References

Villages in Tonk district